Holy Trinity Monastery ( or Mănăstirea Strâmba) is a Romanian Orthodox monastery in Romania, located in Strâmba-Jiu village, Turceni town, Gorj County, Romania.

Geography
The monastery is located at 9 km from Dealu Mare Monastery.

Gallery

References
 România - Harta mănăstirilor, Amco Press, 2000

Bibliography
 Monografia istoricului gorjean Alexandru Ștefulescu: „Mănăstirea Strâmba”, Târgu Jiu, 1906, Editura Miloșescu.

External links

Romanian Orthodox monasteries of Gorj County
Historic monuments in Gorj County